The EL/M-2083 is an aerostat-mounted Airborne early warning and control radar. Another system of this kind is the Tethered Aerostat Radar System.

It is an early warning and control active electronically scanned array radar designed to detect hostile approaching aircraft from long ranges, especially when they approach at low altitudes. Data gathered by the radar is transmitted to a central air defense command & control center where it is used to maintain an extended comprehensive air situation picture.

Once a potential threat has been detected the onboard system alerts responders in a timely manner.

Detection range for fighter aircraft is in excess of 250 km (135 Nm).

It is based on the EL/M-2080 Green Pine.

Operators

References

New EL/M-2083 Phased Array Air Defense Radar To Be Fielded On Israel Air Force's Extended Air Defense System

Military radars of Israel
Elta products
Aerostat radars